Davudabad (also romanized as Dāvūdābād, Davood Abad, and Dāvodābād; also known as Dowtabād) is a village in Khorram Dasht Rural District, Kamareh District, Khomeyn County, Markazi Province, Iran. According to the 2006 census, its population was 183, with 53 families.

References 

Populated places in Khomeyn County